William Glover (1559-1629) was an English politician who sat in the House of Commons in 1624.

Glover was the son of John Glover. In 1624, he was elected Member of Parliament for Orford for the Happy Parliament.

References

16th-century births
Year of death missing
English MPs 1624–1625